Cissna Park is a village in Pigeon Grove Township, Iroquois County, Illinois, United States. The population was 846 at the 2010 census.

Geography
Cissna Park is located in southern Iroquois County at  (40.564674, -87.893988). Illinois Route 49 passes through the village, leading north  to Crescent City and south  to Rankin.

Demographics

As of the census of 2000, there were 811 people, 375 households, and 217 families residing in the village. The racial makeup of the village was 99.14% White, 0.5% African American, 0.12% Native American, 0.12% Asian, 0.12% from other races, and 0.25% from two or more races. Hispanic or Latino of any race were 0.74% of the population.

There were 375 households, out of which 22.9% had children under the age of 18 living with them, 46.7% were married couples living together, 9.3% had a female householder with no husband present, and 41.9% were non-families. 38.9% of all households were made up of individuals, and 24.8% had someone living alone who was 65 years of age or older.  The average household size was 2.12 and the average family size was 2.81.

In the village, the population was spread out, with 20.1% under the age of 18, 7.2% from 18 to 24, 24.5% from 25 to 44, 21.5% from 45 to 64, and 26.8% who were 65 years of age or older.  The median age was 44 years. For every 100 females, there were 79.0 males.  For every 100 females age 18 and over, there were 78.0 males.

The median income for a household in the village was $35,592, and the median income for a family was $49,167. Males had a median income of $31,382 versus $18,026 for females. The per capita income for the village was $18,285.  About 3.6% of families and 7.4% of the population were below the poverty line, including 8.8% of those under age 18 and 9.4% of those age 65 or over.

References

Villages in Iroquois County, Illinois
Villages in Illinois